Leendert "Leen" Huijzer (born 23 March 1946), better known by his stage name Lee Towers, is a Dutch singer with international success. He remains as one of the best-selling artists and holds the record for the most concerts performed by a single artist at the Rotterdam Ahoy, making him one of the most successful artists of all time.

Career
Towers' performing range has included pop, show tunes, country, soul and gospel.

He was discovered in 1975 as "The Singing Crane Mechanic", while laboring as a dockworker in Rotterdam. His music has charted in the Netherlands' music charts successfully from the early 1970s up until the present day.

He is well known in the Netherlands for bringing large theatrical performances to his fans in the style of Las Vegas shows. He holds a record in the Netherlands for performing the most concerts for a single artist at one single venue. Since the 1980s, Towers has held 50 gala performances at Rotterdam Ahoy, a multi-purpose arena, which now hosts a bronze bust of him at the entrance.
Towers was initially part of the show orchestra Len Hauser & the Drifting Five and broke through in 1975 when he was presented by Willem Duys as the singing crane operator from Rotterdam (however he worked as a maintenance bank worker at the Boele shipyard in Bolnes). He recorded his first single, "Louisa", under the name Leen Huizer. Later, around 1971, there was the Dutch single "Nina Nina Nina", which he released under the name Len Hauser. Willem Duys released the first single performed under the name Lee Towers on the radio program "Music Mosaic"; the song was "It's Raining in My Heart", composed by the lead singer of the Outsiders, Wally Tax. "It's Raining in My Heart" made it to the charts. The next single, "You'll Never Walk Alone" (released as "You Never Walk Alone"), became Towers' biggest hit and was in the top 10 for weeks.

Towers gave his first major concert in De Doelen in Rotterdam in 1980, a unique achievement for the time. In 1981, a concert followed in a sold out venue. He then took the step to Ahoy in 1984 where he produced a sold out show twice.

In later years, many concerts and shows followed in Ahoy, where he also sang duets with Anita Meyer and others.

In 2003, Towers starred in the Dutch youth film Sinterklaas and the Danger in the Valley, directed by Martijn van Nellestijn.

Towers is known as a great Feyenoord supporter. His songs "Mijn Feyenoord" and "You Never Walk Alone" are played a lot in De Kuip and have become real club songs. If Feyenoord will win an important prize, Towers will sing "You Never Walk Alone" during the ceremony on the Coolsingel.

His best-known hits are "You'll Never Walk Alone" (which is also a favourite on the terraces of Feyenoord's De Kuip), "Olympic Games" (which he recorded for the Let the Games Begin LP which was to coincide with the 1992 Summer Olympics) and "I Can See Clearly Now".

On 1 November 2011, Towers returned to Ahoy for "One Night Only", a special concert commemorating his 35 years in the entertainment business, as well as his 51st Vegas-style concert in the venue, in front of 12,000 fans. Towers had performed in many places around the world over his 40 years.

On January 27, 2013, the documentary Lee Towers: The Voice of Rotterdam premiered during the Rotterdam Film Festival. Filmmaker Hans Heijnen followed Towers for the project with the camera for a year.

Lee Towers with Glennis Grace, are the only ones who have performed at three different Toppers in Concert editions (2007, 2014 and 2016). At the end of 2016, De Toppers released the Christmas single, "A Very Happy Christmas". Towers played an extra role in the accompanying video clip.

In 2018, he participated in the television program Best Singers. He performed a cover of "What About Us" by Pink and recorded it as a single soon after.

Awards 
The city of Rotterdam awarded him the Erasmus pin in 1990 and the Wolfert van Borselen medal in 2000.

In 2006, he was awarded a Society Award along with Bridget Maasland. He was awarded the title "Ambassador of Rotterdam Port" as well as becoming "Ambassador for Feyenoord Football Club 2005". He has received many other awards for his charity work and music achievements.

In 2017, he received the Edison Oeuvre Prize for his enormous oeuvre and extraordinary achievements in Dutch music.

On November 13, 2019, Towers opened the residential towers in Rotterdam named after him.

Discography

Albums

|-
|align="left"|It's Raining in My Heart||1976||12-06-1976||3||18||
|-
|align="left"|A Christmas Song for You||1976||01-01-1977||37||3||
|-
|align="left"|Special Request||1977||21-05-1977||16||10||
|-
|align="left"|Still Loves You||1978||08-07-1978||27||9||
|-
|align="left"|Definitelee||1979||26-05-1979||27||12||
|-
|align="left"|Simply the Best||1980||15-11-1980||11||15|| Verzamelalbum
|-
|align="left"|Absolutelee||1981||24-10-1981||11||17||
|-
|align="left"|New York||1982||11-09-1982||6||23||
|-
|align="left"|In Concert||1983||14-05-1983||16||17|| Livealbum
|-
|align="left"|I Believe in Music||1983||17-09-1983||14||14||
|-
|align="left"|Gala of the Year||1984||01-12-1984||8||15|| Livealbum
|-
|align="left"|You and Me||1985||14-09-1985||21||10||
|-
|align="left"|The Merry Christmas||1985||21-12-1985||31||4||
|-
|align="left"|Run to Me||1986||15-03-1986||5||22|| met Anita Meyer
|-
|align="left"|Say Hello||1986||06-12-1986||42||9||
|-
|align="left"|Live at Ahoy||1987||06-06-1987||35||7|| Livealbum
|-
|align="left"|The Story of Lee Towers||1987||24-10-1987||58||5|| Verzamelalbum
|-
|align="left"|In Harmony||1988||15-10-1988||35||17||
|-
|align="left"|Listen to My Heart||1990||28-04-1990||30||7||
|-
|align="left"|The Hollywood Album||1991||09-11-1991||61||4||
|-
|align="left"|Jubilee||1995||11-11-1995||76||9||
|-
|align="left"|Country Roads||1999||25-09-1999||5||25|| m.m.v. "South Mountain"
|-
|align="left"|Het mooiste & het beste||2000||19-02-2000||97||1|| Verzamelalbum
|-
|align="left"|Members Only||2000||28-10-2000||31||10||
|-
|align="left"|The Jubilee Collection||2011||05-11-2011||21||1|| Verzamelalbum
|-
|align="left"|Top 100||16-12-2011||24-12-2011||92||1|| met Anita Meyer / Verzamelalbum
|-
|align="left"|Memories||2012||-||-||-||
|-
|align="left"|Sweet Memories||2013||20-04-2013||8||2||
|-
|align="left"|A Christmas Song For You||2018||28-12-2018||49||1||
|-
|align="left"|My Tribute To The Legend||2019||20-04-2019||17||2||
|}

Live albums
Lee Towers in Concert (1983)
Gala of the Year (1984)
Live at Ahoy (1987)
Gala of the Year - Live with Guests (1990)

Singles

|-
|align="left"|It's raining in my heart||1976||10-01-1976||24||7|| No. 14 in the Single Top 100
|-
|align="left"|You never walk alone||1976||26-06-1976||5||7|| No. 1 in the Single Top 100 / Alarmschijf
|-
|align="left"|Everyday||1976||09-10-1976||top 20||-||
|-
|align="left"|Frankie||1978||24-06-1978||18||5|| No. 23 in the Single Top 100
|-
|align="left"|Song of joy||1979||-|||||| No. 41 in the Single Top 100
|-
|align="left"|Bless you||1979||26-05-1979||30||5|| No. 22 in the Single Top 100
|-
|align="left"|Happy birthday baby||<24-12-1979||17-05-1980||30||5|| No. 38 in the Single Top 100
|-
|align="left"|Love potion number nine||1981||31-10-1981||23||6||| No. 30 in the Single Top 100
|-
|align="left"|I can see clearly now||1982||09-10-1982||10||7|| No. 19 in the Single Top 100
|-
|align="left"|Love is all||1982||11-12-1982||top 7||-|| No. 43 in the Single Top 100
|-
|align="left"|I believe in music||1983||24-09-1983||tip6||-|| No. 40 in the Single Top 100
|-
|align="left"|If you know what I mean||1984||07-01-1984||tip14||-||
|-
|align="left"|Let's get the world singing again||1984||06-10-1984||tip17||-||
|-
|align="left"|Run to me||1986||11-01-1986||9||8|| met Anita Meyer /No. 3 in the Single Top 100
|-
|align="left"|We've got tonight||1986||19-04-1986||31||3|| met Anita Meyer /No. 35 in the Single Top 100
|-
|align="left"|Golden lady||1986||22-11-1986||tip17||-||
|-
|align="left"|Highway to freedom||1988||17-09-1988||tip13||-|| No. 79 in the Single Top 100
|-
|align="left"|Lady||1990||21-04-1990||tip11||-|| No. 58 in the Single Top 100
|-
|align="left"|Ik wou dat ik voor één keertje in m'n leven||1992||07-03-1992||22||6|| met Bart de Graaff /No. 22 in the Single Top 100
|-
|align="left"|The drinking song||1995||02-12-1995||tip13||-||
|-
|align="left"|I can see clearly now - Walking on sunshine||1997||28-06-1997||28||3|| met Exposure /No. 44 in the Single Top 100
|-
|align="left"|Mijn Feyenoord||1998||26-12-1998||top 2||-|| No. 40 in the Single Top 100
|-
|align="left"|Feyenoord voor altijd||2008||-|||||| No. 22 in the Single Top 100
|-
|align="left"|Wereldwijd orkest||2011||03-12-2011||12||4|| Als onderdeel van Diverse artiesten /met Het Metropole Orkest & Vince Mendoza / No. 1 in the Single Top 100
|-
|align="left"|Ga door||2012||-|||||| met Johnny Gold /No. 67 in the Single Top 100
|-
|align="left"|Koningslied||19-04-2013||27-04-2013||2||4|| als onderdeel van Nationaal Comité Inhuldiging /No. 1 in the Single Top 100
|-
|align="left"|Kerstmis vier je samen||2014||13-12-2014||tip25||-|| als onderdeel van Eenmaal Voor Allen /No. 68 in the Single Top 100
|}

DVDs

References

External links 

 
 

1946 births
Dutch male singers
Living people
People from Ridderkerk